Laaksonen is a Finnish surname. Notable people with the surname include:

Verner Laaksonen (1895–1985), Finnish long-distance runner
Tom of Finland (Touko Laaksonen, 1920–1991), Finnish artist
Olavi Laaksonen (1921–2004), Finnish footballer
Jukka Laaksonen (born 1958), Finnish comedian
Heli Laaksonen (born 1972), Finnish poet
Antti Laaksonen (born 1973), Finnish ice hockey player
Emma Terho (née Laaksonen, born 1981), Finnish ice hockey player
Valtter Laaksonen (born 1984), Finnish footballer
Ninni Laaksonen (born 1986), Miss Finland 2006
Jesse Laaksonen (born 1989), Finnish ice hockey player
Johannes Laaksonen (born 1990), Finnish footballer
Jere Laaksonen (born 1991), Finnish ice hockey player
Henri Laaksonen (born 1992), Swiss-Finnish tennis player

Finnish-language surnames